The 2017 Prudential U.S. Figure Skating Championships were held from January 14–22 at the Sprint Center in Kansas City, Missouri and Silverstein Eye Centers Arena in Independence, Missouri. Medals were awarded in the disciplines of men's singles, ladies singles, pair skating, and ice dancing at the senior, junior, novice, intermediate, and juvenile levels. The results were part of the U.S. selection criteria for the 2017 Four Continents, 2017 World Junior Championships, and the 2017 World Championships.

Kansas City was announced as the host in December 2015.

Qualifying 
Competitors qualified at regional and sectional competitions held from October to November 2016 or earned a bye.

In November 2016, U.S. Figure Skating published the list of skaters who had qualified or received a bye to the 2017 U.S. Championships. A number of skaters later withdrew, including Adam Rippon, Polina Edmunds, Alexa Scimeca Knierim / Chris Knierim, Caitlin Fields / Ernie Utah Stevens, and Jessica Calalang / Zack Sidhu.

Medal summary

Senior

Junior

Novice

Intermediate

Juvenile

Senior results

Senior men

Senior ladies

Senior pairs
Kayne/O'Shea withdrew due to a concussion. She hit her head while attempting a throw triple flip during the short program on January 19.

Senior ice dance

Junior results

Junior men

Junior ladies

Junior pairs

Junior ice dance

Novice results

Novice men

Novice ladies

Novice pairs

Novice ice dance

International team selections 
According to a rule change made by U.S. Figure Skating in autumn 2016 and approved in December, champions at the 2017 U.S. Championships no longer automatically qualify to the World Championships.

Four Continents
The team for the 2017 Four Continents Championships was announced on January 21 and 22, 2017.

World Junior Championships 
The team for the 2017 World Junior Championships was announced on January 21 and 22, 2017.

World Championships 
The team for the 2017 World Championships was announced on January 21 and 22, 2017.

References 

http://www.usfigureskating.org/leaderboard/results/2017/24267/results.html

External links
 

2017
2017 in figure skating
2017 in American sports
2017 in sports in Missouri
January 2017 sports events in the United States